The Cheltenham Music Festival is a British music festival, held annually in Cheltenham in the summer months (June, July) since 1945.  The festival is renowned for premieres of contemporary music, hosting over 250 music premieres as of July 2004.

John Manduell was the first Programme Director (de facto artistic director) of the festival, for 25 seasons from 1969 to 1994.

Artistic directors
 John Manduell (1969–1994)
 Michael Berkeley (1995–2004)
 Martyn Brabbins (2005–2007)
 Meurig Bowen (2007–2017)
 Alison Balsom (2018–2019)
Camilla King (2019–2021)
Michael Duffy (2022–present)

See also
 Cheltenham Festivals

References

External links

Music festivals in Gloucestershire
Festivals in Cheltenham
Music festivals established in 1945
Classical music festivals in England
Contemporary classical music festivals